Jordan Jean Luc Agostinho Machado (born 28 January 1995) is a professional footballer who plays as a defender for Championnat National 3 club L'Union-Saint-Jean FC. Born in France, he is a former Portugal youth international.

Club career
Machado started his career with Ligue 1 side Montpellier, but left due to the departure of head coach Rolland Courbis. After that, he trained with Levante in the before playing college soccer for Florida International University.

On 5 August 2021, Machado signed with Bastia-Borgo in the Championnat National.

References

External links
 

1995 births
Footballers from Montpellier
Living people
Portuguese footballers
Portugal youth international footballers
Association football defenders
Montpellier HSC players
FIU Panthers men's soccer players
R.F.C. Seraing (1922) players
FC Bastia-Borgo players
Championnat National 2 players
Championnat National 3 players
Championnat National players
Challenger Pro League players
Portuguese expatriate footballers
Expatriate soccer players in the United States
Expatriate footballers in Belgium
Portuguese expatriate sportspeople in the United States
Portuguese expatriate sportspeople in Belgium